Emma Olivia Chapman (née Woodfield) is a British physicist and Royal Society Dorothy Hodgkin Research Fellow at Imperial College London. Her research investigates the epoch of reionization. She won the 2018 Royal Society Athena Prize. In November 2020 Chapman published her first book, First Light: Switching on Stars at the Dawn of Time.

Early life and education 
Chapman achieved first class honours for a Master of Physics (MPhys) degree in Physics at Durham University in 2010. She completed her PhD, Seeing the Light: Foreground Removal in the Dark and Dim Ages, at University College London. She won the University College London Chris Skinner Department of Physics and Astronomy Thesis Prize. Chapman became concerned about PhD culture and how it impacts women.

Research and career 
Following her PhD, Chapman remained at University College London as a Square Kilometre Array funded postdoctoral researcher. Chapman was awarded a Royal Astronomical Society Research Fellowship in 2013. She won the Institute of Physics Early Career Woman Physicist of the Year Award in 2014. In 2018, Chapman was awarded a Dorothy Hodgkin Fellowship by the Royal Society.

Her research investigates the Epoch of Reionisation, the time in the universe when the stars began to radiate light. Chapman works with the Low-Frequency Array telescope (LOFAR).

In 2017 Chapman was highly commended in the L'Oréal-UNESCO For Women in Science Awards. She was an invited speaker at the Cheltenham Science Festival. She spoke about the first era of stars at the 2018 New Scientist Live.

Chapman brought a successful lawsuit against University College London for sexual harassment through the law firm of Ann Olivarius. She settled the case for £70,000 and then campaigned against the use of gag-orders or "non-disclosure settlements." As a result of her campaign, University College of London has abandoned non-disclosure settlements.

The 1752 group 
She has spoken about bias in science at the Royal Institution, Wellcome Collection and on the BBC. Chapman is a member of The 1752 Group, a lobbying group to end staff-student sexual harassment in academia. She was a keynote speaker on the topic at the International Union of Pure and Applied Physics (IUPAP) International Conference for Women in Physics. She partnered with the National Union of Students (NUS) to conduct a survey of staff-student sexual harassment. They found that there was widespread misconduct in higher education and that institutions did not adequately support the victims.

Publications 
Chapman is author of one book:

Awards and honours
In 2018, Chapman was awarded the Royal Society Athena Prize for her work to end staff-student sexual harassment and bullying in academia.

Personal life
Chapman had her first child during the last year of her PhD. She has two children.

References

External links 
 

Year of birth missing (living people)
Women astrophysicists
British astrophysicists
21st-century British astronomers
British women physicists
Academics of Imperial College London
Alumni of University College London
Alumni of Durham University
Living people
21st-century British physicists
21st-century British women scientists